The 2014 United States House of Representatives elections in Minnesota took place in the U.S. state of Minnesota on November 4, 2014, to elect Minnesota's eight representatives in the United States House of Representatives for two-year terms, one from each of Minnesota's eight congressional districts. Primary elections were held on August 12, 2014.

In these elections, Minnesotans elected their oldest U.S. House delegation across the 80 cycles since statehood, at an average age of 58.8 years: Rick Nolan (age 70), Collin Peterson (70), John Kline (67), Betty McCollum (60), Keith Ellison (51), Tom Emmer (53), Tim Walz (50) and Erik Paulsen (49).

Overview

By district
Results of the 2014 United States House of Representatives elections in Minnesota by district:

District 1

DFL incumbent Tim Walz had represented the 1st district since 2007.

Republican State Representative Mike Benson, Jim Hagedorn of Blue Earth and U.S. Army veteran Aaron Miller of Byron all sought the nomination to challenge Walz. Hagedorn and Miller had pledged to abide by the Republican endorsement while Benson did not. On April 5, 2014, Aaron Miller won the GOP endorsement. Benson and Hagedorn then withdrew, though Hagedorn re-entered the race on May 18, expressing concerns that Miller was not dedicating enough time to the race.

Democratic–Farmer–Labor primary

Candidates
Nominee
 Tim Walz, incumbent U.S. Representative

Results

Republican primary

Candidates
Declared
 Jim Hagedorn, candidate for the seat in 2010
 Aaron Miller, U.S. Army veteran

Withdrew
 Mike Benson, state representative

Declined
 Jeremy Miller, state senator

Results

General election

Polling

Tim Walz vs. generic opponent

Generic Democrat vs. generic Republican

Results

District 2

Republican Representative John Kline was rumored to be interested in running for Governor of Minnesota or the United States Senate. Instead, he announced he would seek re-election. David Gerson challenged Kline for the Republican nomination but conceded after Kline won the Republican endorsement.

The 2014 election in the 2nd district was expected to be one of the tightest congressional races in the country. Kline's district was one of 17 Republican congressional districts to vote for President Barack Obama in 2012, and polling data suggested a Democratic challenger could unseat Kline.

Republican primary

Candidates
Declared
 John Kline, incumbent U.S. Representative

Withdrew
 David Gerson, candidate for the seat in 2012

Declined
 Kurt Bills, former state representative and nominee for the U.S. Senate in 2012
 Chris Gerlach, state senator and Dakota County Commissioner
 Pat Garofalo, state representative
 Kelby Woodard, state representative

Results

Democratic–Farmer–Labor primary
Mike Obermueller, who lost to Kline in 2012, had decided to run again. He won the DFL endorsement on April 26, 2014. Sona Mehring, the founder of CaringBridge, declared her candidacy, but dropped out of the race three weeks later. Thomas Craft, who volunteered for Obermueller in the 2012 race, declared his candidacy in July 2013 and positioned himself as a fiscally conservative, socially liberal alternative to Kline and Obermueller. Craft ceased his campaign after Obermueller won the DFL endorsement. Eagan quality assurance analyst Paula Overby initially sought the DFL endorsement but withdrew after Obermueller won it and instead became the Independence Party nominee.

Declared
 Mike Obermueller, former state representative and nominee for the seat in 2012
 Michael Roberts

Withdrew
 Thomas Craft, IT consultant
 Sona Mehring, founder of CaringBridge
 Paula Overby, quality assurance analyst (ran for the Independence nomination)

Results

Independence primary

Candidates
Nominee
 Paula Overby, quality assurance analyst

Results

General election

Polling

Results

District 3

Republican U.S. Representative Erik Paulsen considered running for governor or the United States Senate in 2014. He announced he would seek re-election to the U.S. House instead.

Republican primary

Candidates
Declared
 Erik Paulsen, incumbent U.S. Representative

Democratic–Farmer–Labor primary

Candidates
Declared
 Sharon Sund, businesswoman

Declined
 James Lawrence, businessman
 Don Shelby, former WCCO-TV anchor

General election

Results

District 4

Democratic–Farmer–Labor primary

Candidates
Nominee
 Betty McCollum, incumbent U.S. Representative

Republican primary

Candidates
Nominee
 Sharna Wahlgren

Independence primary

Candidates
Nominee
 Dave Thomas, educator, firefighter, and Iraq War veteran

General election

Results

District 5

Democratic–Farmer–Labor primary

Candidates
Nominee
 Keith Ellison, incumbent U.S Representative

Republican primary

Candidates
Nominee
 Doug Daggett

Independence primary

Candidates
Nominee
 Lee Bauer

General election

Results

District 6

Republican U.S. Representative Michele Bachmann won re-election in 2012, defeating DFL nominee Jim Graves by approximately 1.2 percentage points, although fellow Republican Mitt Romney received 56% of the vote to Democrat Barack Obama's 41% in this district in the 2012 presidential election. Bachmann announced on May 29, 2013, that she would not seek re-election. Graves, who had previously said he would run again, said he would continue to run. However, on May 31, 2013, Graves announced that he was suspending his campaign.

Former state representative and 2010 gubernatorial nominee Tom Emmer and Anoka County Commissioner Rhonda Sivarajah sought the Republican nomination. Allan Levene, a Kennesaw, Georgia, resident who sought the Republican nomination in four congressional districts in four separate states, including Minnesota, ultimately did not file an affidavit of candidacy.

Republican primary

Candidates
Declared
 Tom Emmer, former state representative and nominee for Governor in 2010
 Rhonda Sivarajah, Anoka County Commissioner

Withdrew
 Phil Krinkie, former state representative
 Allan Levene, resident of Georgia running in three other congressional races
 John Pederson, state senator

Declined
 Michele Bachmann, incumbent U.S. Representative

Polling

Results

Democratic–Farmer–Labor primary
Joe Perske, Mayor of Sartell, Minnesota, was the DFL endorsed candidate and nominee. Judy Adams, a painter and environmental activist, and Jim Read, an author and professor of political science at the College of Saint Benedict and Saint John's University, both withdrew after failing to win the DFL endorsement.

Candidates
Nominee
 Joe Perske, Mayor of Sartell

Withdrew
 Judy Adams, environmental activist
 Jim Graves, businessman and nominee for the seat in 2012
 Jim Read, professor at the College of Saint Benedict and Saint John's University

Results

Independence primary

Candidates
Nominee
 John Denney

Results

General election

Results

District 7

The 7th district covers almost the entire western side of Minnesota. It is the largest district in the state and one of the largest in the country and includes the cities of Moorhead, Fergus Falls, Alexandria and Willmar. The incumbent was DFLer Collin Peterson, who had represented the district since 1991. He was re-elected with 60% of the vote in 2012 and the district has a PVI of R+6.

In 2013, Republicans began pressuring Peterson, in hopes of convincing him to retire. His seat was one of only a handful that was represented by a Democrat but was carried by Republican presidential nominee Mitt Romney in the 2012 election and was seen as a top pick-up opportunity had Peterson retired. Their tactics included airing television advertisements, hiring a press staffer to give opposition research to reporters, hiring a tracker to follow him around his district and record him, and sending mobile billboards with critical statements on them to drive around his hometown. Peterson responded by saying "They don't have anybody else to go after. It's kind of ridiculous, but whatever." After Republicans spread rumors that Peterson was planning to buy a house in Florida and retire there, he said: "I went from neutral on running again to 90 percent just because of this stupid stuff they're doing. You can't let these people be in charge of anything, in my opinion." On March 17, 2014, Peterson officially announced that he was running for re-election, saying, "I still have a lot of work to do."

Democratic–Farmer–Labor primary

Candidates
Nominee
 Collin Peterson, incumbent U.S. Representative

Declined
 Paul Marquart, state representative

Republican primary

Candidates
Nominee
 Torrey Westrom, state senator

Declined
 Dan Fabian, state representative
 Mary Franson, state representative
 Bill Ingebrigtsen, state senator
 Morrie Lanning, former state representative
 Marty Seifert, former Minority Leader of the Minnesota House of Representatives and candidate for Governor of Minnesota in 2010 and 2014
 Scott Van Binsbergen, businessman

General election

Polling

Results

District 8

Democratic–Farmer–Labor primary

Candidates
Nominee
 Rick Nolan, incumbent U.S. Representative

Republican primary

Candidates
Nominee
 Stewart Mills III, Mills Fleet Farm executive

Green Party
Nominee
 Skip Sandman

General election

Polling

Results

See also
 2014 Minnesota elections
 2014 United States House of Representatives elections

References

External links
 Elections & Voting - Minnesota Secretary of State
 U.S. House elections in Minnesota, 2014 at Ballotpedia
 Campaign contributions at OpenSecrets

Minnesota
2014
United States House of Representatives